Mueang Khon Kaen is the capital district (amphoe mueang) of Khon Kaen province, northeastern Thailand.

Geography
Neighboring districts are (from the south clockwise) Ban Haet, Phra Yuen, Ban Fang, Ubolratana, Nam Phong, and Sam Sung of Khon Kaen Province; Kosum Phisai and Chiang Yuen of Maha Sarakham province.

History
On 29 April  1917, the district name was changed from Mueang to Phra Lap (พระลับ). On 14 November 1937 it was renamed Mueang Khon Kaen.

Administration
The district is divided into 17 sub-districts (tambons), which are further subdivided into 272 villages (mubans). The city (thesaban nakhon) Khon Kaen covers the whole tambon Nai Mueang. Tha Phra is a sub-district municipality (thesaban tambon) covering parts of tambon Tha Phra. There are a further 16 tambon administrative organizations (TAO).

References

External links
amphoe.com (Thai)

Mueang Khon Kaen